Glenn Frendo is a former professional rugby league footballer who played in the 1980s and early 1990s. He played for the Canterbury-Bankstown Bulldogs from 1986–87 and he was part of the inaugural Newcastle Knights squad from 1988-90.

Background
Frendo played his junior rugby league for Bankstown Sports before being graded by Canterbury.

Playing career
Frendo made his first grade debut for Canterbury against Penrith in Round 17 1986.  Frendo made 7 appearances for the club that season but did not feature in the finals series or the grand final loss against Parramatta.

In 1988, Frendo signed with Newcastle and played in the club's first ever game, a 28-4 loss against Parramatta.  Frendo played 3 seasons with Newcastle and his last game for the club was a 20-6 loss against Penrith in Round 19 1990.

References

External links
http://www.rugbyleagueproject.org/players/Glenn_Frendo/summary.html

Australian rugby league players
Newcastle Knights players
Canterbury-Bankstown Bulldogs players
Living people
Rugby league fullbacks
1964 births
Place of birth missing (living people)